Pacific High School is a public high school in Pacific, Missouri that is part of the Meramec Valley School District.

References

External links
Pacific H.S.

High schools in Franklin County, Missouri
Public high schools in Missouri